Music Acquisition is a theory that people can acquire music over time.   Research shows that the definition or attributes used for expression through language can also be used for expression through music or musical instruments

This theory is influenced by the concept of language acquisition, gaining the ability to perceive and comprehend a language over time. Language acquisition also includes the use and production of language as a form of expression.

Scientifically, there is insufficient information or cases to determine that music acquisition is even possible.

References

External links 
 
 NCBI Music and Early Language Acquisition
 Music and Language (1992) by Chris Dobrian

Music psychology